The petrotympanic fissure (also known as the squamotympanic fissure or the glaserian fissure) is a fissure in the temporal bone that runs from the temporomandibular joint to the tympanic cavity.

The mandibular fossa is bounded, in front, by the articular tubercle; behind, by the tympanic part of the bone, which separates it from the external acoustic meatus; it is divided into two parts by a narrow slit, the petrotympanic fissure.

It opens just above and in front of the ring of bone into which the tympanic membrane is inserted; in this situation it is a mere slit about 2 mm. in length. It lodges the anterior process and anterior ligament of the malleus, and gives passage to the anterior tympanic branch of the internal maxillary artery.

Eponym
It is also known as the "Glaserian fissure", after Johann Glaser.

Contents
The contents of the fissure include communications of cranial nerve VII to the infratemporal fossa.  A branch of cranial nerve VII, the chorda tympani, runs through the fissure to join with the lingual nerve providing special sensory (taste) innervation to the tongue. Anterior tympanic artery and tympanic veins also pass through the structure. Petrotympanic fissure contains some of the fibers of the anterior ligament of malleus, which run on the base of skull and eventually attach onto the spine of sphenoid bone.

See also
 Chorda tympani
 Petrosquamous suture

References

External links
 
 

Foramina of the skull